The Wadi Qattara Dam, also referred to as Gattara or Al-Qattarah, is a clay-fill embankment dam located on Wadi Al-Qattara,  east of Benghazi in Libya. They were also constructed for irrigation water supply. Construction of the dams began in 1968 and was completed in 1971. However, a flood in 1979 severely damaged the main dam and destroyed the secondary dam downstream. The main dam was rehabilitated and the secondary dam was replaced with a rock-fill dam between 2000 and 2004 at a cost of US$30 million. Both dams were designed by Coyne et Bellier.

References

Qattara
Buildings and structures in Benghazi
Dam failures in Africa
Dams completed in 1971
1971 establishments in Libya
Earth-filled dams
1979 disasters in Africa
Man-made disasters in Libya